The 1979 Bowling Green Falcons football team was an American football team that represented Bowling Green University in the Mid-American Conference (MAC) during the 1979 NCAA Division I-A football season. In their third season under head coach Denny Stolz, the Falcons compiled a 4–7 record (3–5 against MAC opponents), finished in eighth place in the MAC, and were outscored by their opponents by a combined total of 265 to 194.

The team's statistical leaders included Mike Wright with 1,148 passing yards, Kevin Folkes with 696 rushing yards, and Dan Shetler with 502 receiving yards.

Schedule

References

Bowling Green
Bowling Green Falcons football seasons
Bowling Green Falcons football